KNT may refer to:

Kennett Memorial Airport, Missouri, IATA airport code
Kenton station, London, National Rail station code
The registration table code for Nowy Targ